Opisthotropis lateralis, the Tonkin mountain keelback,  is a species of natricine snake found in Vietnam and China.

References

Opisthotropis
Reptiles described in 1903
Reptiles of Vietnam
Reptiles of China
Taxa named by George Albert Boulenger